Like a Dream is an album by Darek Oleszkiewicz.

Background
This was Oleszkiewicz's first album as leader. He had previously appeared as a sideman on numerous albums.

Music and release
Oleszkiewicz composed and arranged all but one of the tracks. The first five tracks are duets with pianist Brad Mehldau. Two tracks are Los Angeles Jazz Quartet recordings, with saxophonist Chuck Manning, guitarist Larry Koonse and drummer Mark Ferber. "The last four songs feature a trio with pianist Adam Benjamin and drummer Nate Wood", with tenor saxophonist Bernie Maupin added for one.

The album was released by Cryptogramophone Records in 2004.

Reception

The AllMusic reviewer concluded that "This is an auspicious debut that should help Darek Oleszkiewicz gain wider recognition."

Track listing
"November"
"You Don't Know What Love Is"
"Like a Dream"
"Time Cafe"
"Blues for Eden"
"Precious Moments"
"Before the Journey"
"Gift"
"That Night"
"Conclusion Part One"
"Conclusion Part Two"
"Conclusion Part Three"

Personnel
 Darek Oleszkiewicz – bass
 Brad Mehldau – piano
 Chuck Manning – sax
 Larry Koonse – guitar
 Mark Ferber – drums
 Adam Benjamin – piano
 Nate Wood – drums
 Bennie Maupin – tenor sax

References

2004 albums
Cryptogramophone Records albums